Jesús García (1881–1907) was a Mexican railroad brakeman and national hero

Jesús García may also refer to:

Jesús "Chuy" García (born 1956), American politician from Illinois
Jesús Ángel García (born 1969), Spanish race walker
Jesús García Leoz (1904–1953), Spanish composer
Jesús Garibay García (born 1946), Mexican PRD politician
Jesús Reyna García (born 1952), Mexican lawyer and PRI politician
Jesús García (basketball) (born 1952), Mexican Olympic basketball player

Footballers 
Jesús García Pitarch (born 1963), Spanish footballer
Jesús Miguel García (born 1989), Mexican footballer
Jesús Sánchez García (born 1989), Mexican footballer
Jesús García Tena (born 1990), Spanish footballer
Jesús Álvaro García (born 1990), Spanish footballer
Jesús Daniel García (born 1994), Mexican footballer